Volodymyr Viktorovych Konovalov (born 5 January 1973) is a former Ukrainian football player.

External links
 

1973 births
Living people
Soviet footballers
Ukrainian footballers
Ukrainian expatriate footballers
Expatriate footballers in Russia
Expatriate footballers in Belarus
Russian Premier League players
FC Baltika Kaliningrad players
FC Rechitsa-2014 players
FC Spartak Vladikavkaz players
FC Slavia Mozyr players
FC Mariupol players
FC Torpedo Minsk players
FC Torpedo Mogilev players
FC Naftan Novopolotsk players
FC Fandok Bobruisk players
Association football forwards